Love Marriage is a 2001 Indian Tamil-language film directed by K. Subash making it his last directorial in Tamil films. A remake of the Telugu film Swayamvaram, it was produced by Vikram Krishna then known as Ajay, who also appeared in the lead role alongside Ranjana. The film was released on 14 December 2001.

Cast

 Ajay as Shreekanth
 Ranjana as Shobha
 Shyam Ganesh as Vimal
 Vijayakumar as Shreekanth's father
 Vadivelu as Chitti Babu
 Fathima Babu as Shreekanth's mother 
 Anu Mohan
 Pandu
 Mohan Raman
 R. S. Sivaji
 Chaplin Balu
 Kovai Senthil

Production
The film was partially shot in Switzerland, with the BBC reporting on the film's schedule in Geneva.

Soundtrack
Soundtrack was composed by Deva and lyrics were written by Gangai Amaran, Palani Bharathi, Na. Muthukumar and Thamarai. The song "Keeravani" from the original Telugu film has been retained here.

Reception
Malini Mannath of Chennai Online felt "There is not much excitement here, neither in the scenes nor in the starcast." Malathi Rangarajan of The Hindu wrote ""Love Marriage" is neither a boring love triangle nor a melodrama of friendship and sacrifice. And the film rises above any predictable formula — but only to be caught in a web of a very loosely hanging storyline."

References

External links
 Love Marriage at Jointscene.com

2001 films
Films shot in Ooty
Films scored by Deva (composer)
2000s Tamil-language films
Tamil remakes of Telugu films
Films directed by K. Subash